Eaglefield is a locality in the Isaac Region, Queensland, Australia.

Geography 
The Suttor River forms the western boundary of the locality. The Suttor Developmental Road passes through the locality from east to west crossing the Suttor River on the western boundary. The Goonyella – Abbot Point line (GAP railway line) passes through the locality from north to south to the North Goonyella coal mine in neighbouring Moranbah.

The land is a mixture of freehold and leasehold and mostly has been cleared for low density cattle grazing; however, mining activities have been proposed for the locality.

References 

Isaac Region
Localities in Queensland